Lőrinc Barabás (born March 10, 1983, Budapest) is a Hungarian jazz trumpeter and composer.

Studies

Barabás began to study the trumpet at Szabolcsi Bence Music School at the age of twelve where his teacher was Krisztina Nemes. He continued his studies between 1999 and 2001 at the jazz trumpet faculty of the Kőbányai Music Studio. He later was accepted to the jazz faculty of the Franz Liszt Academy of Music where he earned his diploma as jazz trumpet teacher and performer under the instruction of Kornél Fekete-Kovács. In 2011 he completed the SAE Institute Electronic Music Production Course in New York, NY, United States.

Music

During his university years Barabás played with numerous bands including Soulwhat, with which they performed in Hongkong and on the Noosa Jazz Festival in Australia and the Uptown Felaz band with whom they won the best original soundtrack prize of the Hungarian Film Festival for the movie Kész Cirkusz (director: Zsombor Dyga). He was a member of Irie Maffia between 2005 and 2009 and participated in the 2008 album Fel a Kezekkel.

He regularly performed with DJ-s such as Dr. Dermot, Suhaid, Palotai and Cadik. Between 2005 and 2010 he organized weekly sessions under the name Random Szerda which were improvisational music evenings with ever-changing line ups (Lámpás Klub, A38, Take Five). In 2008 he released a best of album of these sessions titled Small Talk. In 2005 he established Barabás Lőrinc Eklektric, his own band playing a fusion of jazz-funk and pop. The members of the band were: Sena Dagadu, Juli Fábián, Thomas Kemon Wesley, Mátyás Premecz, István Bata, Jávor Delov, Márton Élő, Dj Qcee. (The band was together until 2010 and released two albums (Ladal 2007, Trick 2009).

From 2009 to 2010 he lived in London organizing weekly sessions under the name Randomlive in the Bedroom Bar in Shoreditch. After the success of Eklektric he decided to change directions and turned towards electronic music. He completed the SAE Institute Electronic Music Production Course in New York, NY, United States and started experimenting with the loop station to multiply the sound of his trumpet in numerous musical functions. His 2013 album Sastra was composed for a three-track loop station. Material from the album was later used as soundtrack for the documentary Élet a Dunán (director: Gergő Somogyvári). His 2015 album Elevator Dance Music is yet again a new musical direction. A mix of instrumental and electronic music with Barabás using loopers and effects and adding keyboard and trumpet to produce his unique sound.

Elevator Dance Music

Experienced jazz trumpet player and producer, Barabás Lőrinc, has played in a variety of formations both in his home town of Budapest and throughout the world. His new album Elevator Dance Music takes a whole new direction and incorporating keyboards, trumpet and laptop in a solo live performance. Groovy, uplifting dance with echoes of 80s electropop is spiced up with the compelling sound of the trumpet. The crossover of sounds and styles, electrifying currents of electro-funk and deeply rhythmic melodies and arpeggios align to create high energy dance music from the spotless mind of a jazz musician.

Barabás Lőrinc Quartet

Established in 2015, Barabás Lőrinc Quartet is an instrumental formation from the popular jazz side with some electronic flavour. Groovy rhythms, impelling bass lines, keyboard and trumpet combined with the taste of seventies jazzrock melt into an exciting and unique combination of music. Members: Lőrinc Barabás (trumpet), Zoltán Cséry (keyboard), Attila Herr (bass), Zsolt Nagy (drums).

Awards

2005 Co-produced the best original sound track prize of the Hungarian Film Festival for the movie Kész Cirkusz (director: Zsombor Dyga)
2010 Márciusi Ifjak Prize for outstanding artistic performance

Sources
Barabás Lőrinc Quartet 
Port.hu 
Búcsúzik a Barabás Lőrinc Eklektric 
Sastra - Album review 

1983 births
Living people
Hungarian jazz trumpeters
21st-century trumpeters